The Rutul Federation or The Rutul Free Society is a Rutul state located in Southern Dagestan and was formed in the 7th century.

Rutuli experienced strong cultural and linguistic pressure from Azerbaijanis and to a lesser extent from Lezghins.

Before the annexation by the Russian Empire, the Rutuls made a federation of multiple rural communities which were known as the "Rutul Magal". This Magal was ruled by a Bek, a permanent leader. These Beks address important issues and are required to convene to a popular assembly.

In the 17th century, the Rutul Federation included Tsakhur villages and captured some Lezgin villages. They did lose two Rutul villages to the Gazikumukh Khanate and two more to the Akhty Federation (Akhty-para). This free society consisted of Rutul and Lezgi villages and was one of the largest free societies, along with Akhty-para, Alty-para and Dokuz-para free societies.

History 
In 1536, the Rutul Federation were allied with the Shamkhalate of Tarki to attack the Akhty Federation. The Akhty Federation attacked Rutul with the support of Derbent Khanate in 1541. Rutul attacked Akhty again in 1542, with the support of the Quba Khanate. In 1574, Gazibek, a representative of the Shamkhalate of Tarki, became the leader of the federation.

His name was mentioned several times: in 1588, the Turkish Sultan Murad III wrote a letter to Gazibek, congratulating him on gaining leadership over the federation. In 1598, Shah Abbas offered Gazibek assistance for the Tsakhur ruler Mahmedbek.

Beks 

 Ilchi-Ahmad (early 15th century)
 Afrosimbeck
 Mahmudbek, son of Afrosimbeck
 Kazimbek, son of Mahmudbeck
 Muhammadbeck
 Gazibek (1574-1601)
 Ibragimkhan (1626-1635)
 Hasankhan (19th century)

References 

1839 disestablishments
History of Dagestan